Essington is a village and civil parish in South Staffordshire, England, located near the city of Wolverhampton and towns of Walsall, Bloxwich, Cannock and Brewood. The villages of Cheslyn Hay, Great Wyrley, Coven, Penkridge and Featherstone are also nearby. The village forms part of the Staffordshire/West Midlands border.

History
In 1870-1872 the  Imperial Gazetteer of England and Wales described Essington as a township in the parish of Bushbury, with a post office and 187 houses. The population had risen from 644 in 1851 to 976 in 1861, "from the extension of mining operations", and an iron church with room for 260 people had been built in 1858–1859.

Village

The village of Essington is small and of comparatively recent build, although there are the remains of several moated farmsteads, possibly of iron-age origin, on the land adjacent to the village's current boundaries.  There is a public park called Brownshore Lakes (known locally as the pools), which is the site of two adjacent lakes. They are the remains of three coal mining tailing and settling ponds. The lakes are surrounded by woodland and it is a local recreational meeting place. It is also home to waterfowl and there is also an abundance of other wildlife around the lakes and the woods.

Transport
The village has direct connections with 2 main major roads: the A462, which runs from Junction 11 of the M6 to Wednesbury, West Midlands, and the A460 that links Wolverhampton with Cannock and Rugeley. The M6 and M54 motorways meet just northeast of the village, and are both accessible via the A460.

While the village was once served by several bus routes, the only service to Essington is route 71.  Operating between Wolverhampton and Cannock, the service runs hourly Monday to Saturdays off-peak. Service 71 is operated by Chaserider. The nearest railway station is Bloxwich North, a 35-minute walk away.

Essington Parish 
The Parish of Essington is quite large encompassing a village a number of recreational, industrial and farming areas and several hamlets and is part of South Staffordshire district in Staffordshire. It borders the county of West Midlands (Walsall and Wolverhampton). Services to the parish can appear confusing: the Post Office have assigned the WV Wolverhampton Post-Code for mail to the area,  British Telecom have given it a Walsall 01922 Telephone prefix, the Health Authority is South Staffordshire, the Ambulance Service is West Midlands, Social Services are South Staffordshire in Codsall. All property taxes (rates) are collected by South Staffordshire at Codsall.

Essington Parish Council is the lowest tier of local government.

School 
The main school in Essington is St Johns Primary Academy. Located on Hobnock Road, it was built in 1846 and became known as St John's Church of England School from 1968.

Brownshore Pre-School Play Group is located opposite St John's Primary School on Hobnock Road.

Essington is a main catchment area for Cheslyn Hay Academy students.

Sports
There are rugby and football facilities in several locations around the parish located in Bognop Road, Essington and High Hill, Essington.

Recreation
A walking group meets most Fridays at about 11 am outside the Minerva Public House in Wolverhampton Road and undertakes walks using some of the many public footpaths around the central village.

Places of worship

St John's Anglican church is in the village and  has many activities during the day and sometimes in the evening. It was built in 1932 and has an extension at the west end, completed in 2015. Outside the village, Essington Wood Methodist Chapel is Bursnips Road (A462).

Notable people 
Ealhswith, queen consort and wife of Alfred the Great, the self-styled first King of England.
 Ralph Sweet-Escott (1869 in Essington – 1907) an English-born international rugby union player, he also played cricket for Glamorgan
 Meera Syal CBE (born 1961) comedian and author; her debut novel Anita and Me was set in the fictional village of Tollington, which was based on Essington in the early 1970s, where she grew up.

See also
Listed buildings in Essington

References

External links 
Essington Parish Council website

Villages in Staffordshire
South Staffordshire District